Into the Valley of the Moonking is the 15th studio album by the English rock band Magnum, released on 15 June 2009 by SPV.

The album charter number 82 in the United Kingdom, going slightly back compared to the previous album. The album also charted in Switzerland for the first time since 1994.

The artwork was illustrated by Rodney Matthews following his sleeve design for Magnum's previous album Princess Alice and the Broken Arrow and Wings of Heaven Live. Into the Valley of the Moonking was released in three different versions: a regular jewel case CD, a Digipak consisting of a CD and bonus DVD, and a vinyl format for collectors with two LPs and a fold-out cover.

Track listing

Personnel
Tony Clarkin – Guitar
Bob Catley – Vocals
Al Barrow – Bass guitar
Mark Stanway – Keyboards
Harry James – Drums

References

External links
 www.magnumonline.co.uk – Official Magnum site
 Record Covers – at rodneymatthews.com

2009 albums
Magnum (band) albums
Albums produced by Tony Clarkin
SPV/Steamhammer albums
Albums with cover art by Rodney Matthews